Zachary Peter Gallen (born August 3, 1995) is an American professional baseball pitcher for the Arizona Diamondbacks of Major League Baseball (MLB). He made his MLB debut with the Miami Marlins in 2019.

Early life 
Gallen was born on August 3, 1995, in Somerdale, New Jersey, to Jim and Stacy Gallen. When he was five years old, he refused to play tee-ball with his peers, instead demanding to play Little League Baseball with the Somerdale team; Gallen was taken in the third round of the Little League draft by his father's team and would play with children between seven and nine years old. At the age of 11, Gallen joined the Tri-state Arsenal Baseball Academy in New Jersey, where he served as a pitcher and second baseman.

College career 
He attended Bishop Eustace Preparatory School in Pennsauken Township, New Jersey and played three years of college baseball at the University of North Carolina. After the 2014 and 2015 seasons, he played collegiate summer baseball with the Chatham Anglers of the Cape Cod Baseball League. During his junior year in 2016, he went 4–3 with a 2.79 ERA along with limiting opponents to a .231 batting average. He was drafted by the St. Louis Cardinals in the third round of the 2016 Major League Baseball draft.

Professional career

St. Louis Cardinals
Gallen made his professional debut with the Gulf Coast Cardinals, posting a 1.86 ERA with 15 strikeouts in 9.2 innings pitched. He started 2017 with the Palm Beach Cardinals and was later promoted to the Springfield Cardinals and Memphis Redbirds. He finished 2017 with a combined 10–8 record, a 2.93 ERA, and a 1.17 WHIP in 26 starts between all three clubs.

Miami Marlins
On December 14, 2017, the Cardinals traded Gallen to the Miami Marlins (along with Sandy Alcántara, Magneuris Sierra, and Daniel Castano) for Marcell Ozuna. He was a non-roster invitee to 2018 spring training. He spent the season with the New Orleans Baby Cakes, going 8–9 with a 3.65 ERA and a 1.47 WHIP in 25 starts. He returned to New Orleans to begin 2019.

On June 20, 2019, his contract was selected and he was called up to the major leagues for the first time. He made his debut that night in a start versus the St. Louis Cardinals, recording six strikeouts and giving up one earned run over five innings pitched.

Arizona Diamondbacks

On July 31, 2019, the Marlins traded Gallen to the Arizona Diamondbacks for shortstop Jazz Chisholm Jr. In eight starts for Arizona, Gallen was 2–3 with a 2.89 ERA in  innings, striking out 53 in the process. In 2020, Gallen continued his success from the previous season, recording 82 strikeouts in 72 innings. He also finished with an ERA of 2.75 and a 3–2 record. 

Gallen returned to the Diamondbacks' rotation for 2022. He was named the NL Pitcher of the Month for August. In 2022, Gallen went 12–4 with a 2.54 ERA in 184 innings, finishing fifth in NL Cy Young voting. He also led the majors in pickoff throws to first base, with 144.

On January 13, 2023, Gallen agreed to a one-year, $5.6 million contract with the Diamondbacks, avoiding salary arbitration.

References

External links

North Carolina Tar Heels bio

1995 births
Living people
Arizona Diamondbacks players
Baseball players from New Jersey
Bishop Eustace Preparatory School alumni
Chatham Anglers players
Gulf Coast Cardinals players
Major League Baseball pitchers
Miami Marlins players
Memphis Redbirds players
New Orleans Baby Cakes players
North Carolina Tar Heels baseball players
Palm Beach Cardinals players
People from Somerdale, New Jersey
Sportspeople from Camden County, New Jersey
Springfield Cardinals players